The Sanetschhore (Swiss German, Germanized: Sanetschorn) or Mont Brun in French is a mountain of the Diablerets massif in the Bernese Alps, overlooking the Sanetsch Pass in Switzerland. It is located between the cantons of Valais and Berne northeast of the main summit of the Diablerets.

References

External links
Sanetschhorn on Hikr

Mountains of the Alps
Mountains of Switzerland
Mountains of Valais
Mountains of the canton of Bern
Bern–Valais border
Two-thousanders of Switzerland